The Purcell effect is the enhancement of a quantum system's spontaneous emission rate by its environment. In the 1940s Edward Mills Purcell discovered the enhancement of spontaneous emission rates of atoms when they are incorporated into a resonant cavity.

The magnitude of the enhancement is given by the Purcell factor

 

Heuristic derivation 
One way of seeing why the Purcell effect arises is by using cavity quantum electrodynamics. Fermi's golden rule dictates that the transition rate for the atom–vacuum (or atom–cavity) system is proportional to the density of final states. In a cavity at resonance, the density of final states is enhanced (though the number of final states may not be). The Purcell factor is then just the ratio of the cavity density of states

 

to that of the free space density of states

 

Using

 

one gets

 

which is correct up to a numerical constant for high- cavity (Hermitian) modes. For low- modes (encountered, for instance, with plasmonic nanoresonators), the Purcell factor takes a slightly different form that accounts for the non-Hermitian character of such modes.

In research 
It has been predicted theoretically  that a 'photonic' material environment can control the rate of radiative recombination of an embedded light source. A main research goal is the achievement of a material with a complete photonic bandgap: a range of frequencies in which no electromagnetic modes exist and all propagation directions are forbidden. At the frequencies of the photonic bandgap, spontaneous emission of light is completely inhibited. Fabrication of a material with a complete photonic bandgap is a huge scientific challenge. For this reason photonic materials are being extensively studied. Many different kinds of systems in which the rate of spontaneous emission is modified by the environment are reported, including cavities, two, and three-dimensional photonic bandgap materials.

The Purcell effect can also be useful for modeling single-photon sources for quantum cryptography. Controlling the rate of spontaneous emission and thus raising the photon generation efficiency is a key requirement for quantum dot based single-photon sources.

References

Photonics